Vasily Maksimovich Afonin (10 February 1919 – 4 January 1996) was a Soviet flying ace who fought in the German-Soviet War. He also participated in the Winter War of 1939–1940. During the German-Soviet War he fought with the 72nd Guards Fighter Aviation Regiment, flying at various times the LaGG-3, Yak-1, Yak-7, Yak-9 and Yak-3.

Retiring at the rank of major, Afonin was officially credited with 14 personal and 3 shared victories over the course of 487 sorties.

Awards and honors
 Hero of the Russian Federation (2 May 1996)
 Three Order of the Red Banner, three times (16 January 1943, 21 July 1943, 12 July 1944)
 Order of the Patriotic War (1st Class - 27 August 1943; 2nd Class - 15 January 1945 and 3 November 1985)
 Medal "For Battle Merit"
 campaign and jubilee medals

References

1919 births
1996 deaths
People from Kireyevsky District
People from Bogoroditsky Uyezd
Communist Party of the Soviet Union members
Soviet Air Force officers
Soviet military personnel of the Winter War
Soviet World War II flying aces
Heroes of the Russian Federation
Recipients of the Order of the Red Banner
Recipients of the Order of the Red Star